Baba means father in several African languages in Southern Africa like Shona and in West African languages such as Yoruba. 

Baba "father, grandfather, wise old man, sir";) is an honorific term, of Persian origin, used in several West Asian and South Asian cultures.

It is used as a mark of respect to refer to Hindu and Sikh ascetics (sannyasis) and is used as a suffix or prefix to their names, e.g. Sai Baba, Baba Ramdevji, etc. 

Baba is also a title accorded to Alevi and sunni religious leader and the head of certain Sufi orders, as in Baba Bulleh Shah, Baba Farid and Rehman Baba. 

Baba is also the title used for the Israeli mystical rabbis of the Abuhatzeira family, descendants of Rabbi Israel Abuhatzeira, originally from Morocco, who was called the Baba Sali and his brother Isaac Abuhatzeira, the Baba Chaki.

The term was also adopted in Malaysia as an honorific of respect to address Chinese people born in British Straits Settlement.

Baba is also the familiar word for "father" in many languages (see mama and papa); in India it has even been adapted to address male children.

See also
 Baba (name)
 Indian honorifics

References

Further reading
 

Religious honorifics
Turkish titles
Titles in Iran
Titles in Azerbaijan
Titles in Afghanistan
Titles in Pakistan
Titles in Bangladesh
Titles in India
Ecclesiastical titles
Persian words and phrases
Bengali words and phrases
Ottoman titles
Ecclesiastical styles